Ekkadiki Ee Parugu is a 2019 Indian Telugu-language web series starring Aryan Rajesh, Shashank, Pavani Gangireddy, Kalpika Ganesh and Chandra Vempaty . It was directed by Abhilash Reddy. The premise of this thriller drama which revolves around Madhur Anand (Shashank), a popular chef, whose wife Vaishnavi (Pavani) goes missing. The investigating officer (Aryan Rajesh), who himself is recovering from the recent death of his wife, suspects Madhur to be the perpetrator.

The series premiered on ZEE5 to positive reviews. It was dubbed and released in Tamil as Thadam.

Premise 
Madhur Anand, a renowned chef, files a police complaint that his wife, Vaishnavi has gone missing. The investigating police officer who himself is recovering from the recent death of his wife suspects foul play, but he doesn't know if he has enough clues to suspect anyone yet. When he begins to investigate the case, things go terribly wrong when he discovers that Madhur Anand might be lying. If this isn't enough, Madhur himself sets out to unravel the mystery about Vaishnavi's life just before her death. The rest of the story is about finding who killed Vaishnavi and what were the circumstances that led to her death.

Cast 

Aryan Rajesh as Investigating officer
Shashank as Madhur
Pavani Gangireddy as Vaishnavi
Kalpika Ganesh as Saira
Chandra Vempaty as Vamshi
Bharat Raj as Raj
Rajsekhar Aningi as Politician
Sudeep Patil as Restaurant Manager

Episodes

Season 1

Season 2

Release 
The web series was released on online streaming platform Zee5 on January 8, 2019.

Reception 
Hemanth Kumar of Firstpost praised the performances of Aryan Rajesh and Pavani Gangireddy but termed it a convoluted web-series and said it would have been better as a film, as the director's initial intention. He criticised the narrative and said that the performances in a few scenes were amateurish, but it worked well in its emotional scenes.

References 

Telugu-language web series
ZEE5 original programming
2019 web series debuts
Indian thriller television series
Crime thriller web series
Indian crime television series
Indian drama web series
2019 web series endings
2019 Indian television series debuts
2019 Indian television series endings